Dennis Smith (born 2 August 1969) is an English professional darts player who plays in Professional Darts Corporation (PDC) events. He is a stalwart on the PDC circuit, having played there since 1994, but has yet to capture a major title to add to his collection of Open wins. Smith has a very unusual throwing action, turning the dart into a 'flight first' position before returning it to a 'point first' position, rolling his eyes and then throwing. He has a unique, measured action learning his trade under the tutelage of Bob Anderson.

PDC career

Smith's first major event came in the inaugural World Matchplay in 1994, beating American Dave Kelly in the first round but lost in the second round to Shayne Burgess. Smith then made his PDC World Darts Championship debut in 1995, defeating Alan Warriner and Tom Kirby to win group 4 and reach the quarter finals, losing to John Lowe. Smith then suffered a first round exit in the 1995 World Matchplay and the 1996 PDC World Darts Championship. He reached the quarter finals of the 1996 World Matchplay, beating Eric Bristow in the first round and then beat Lowe in round two before losing to Jamie Harvey. He then suffered a second successive first round exit in the 1997 World Championship.

Smith then went through a poor run of form, reaching the second round in the 1997 World Matchplay, but suffered first round exits in the 1998 World Championship and the 1998 World Matchplay. His next big major run came in the 1999 PDC World Darts Championship, beating Peter Evison and Mick Manning to reach the quarter finals, losing to Peter Manley. Though another first round exit at the World Matchplay followed, Smith achieved his best run in the 2000 PDC World Darts Championship, beating Cliff Lazarenko, John Part and Lowe to reach the semi finals for the first time, losing 5–0 to Taylor.

Smith then reached the second round of the 2000 World Matchplay and the 2000 World Grand Prix as well as the 2001 PDC World Darts Championship. Smith followed up with a quarter final place in the 2001 World Matchplay and a semi final place in the 2001 World Grand Prix. Another second round exit in the World Championship followed though. Smith played in the first Las Vegas Desert Classic in 2002, losing in the first round to Simon Whatley. He also lost in the first round of the 2002 World Matchplay but followed up by reaching the semi finals of the Bob Anderson Classic and the quarter finals of the World Grand Prix as well as the 2003 World Championship.

Smith made three quarter final showing in major tournaments in 2003, in the Desert Classic, World Matchplay and the World Grand Prix but lost in the second round of the 2004 World Championship. Another quarter final in the Desert Classic in 2004 was followed up by a spell of poor form as Smith began battling personal problems while going through a divorce. Though he reached the quarter finals of the World Matchplay and the semi finals of the World Grand Prix in 2005, poor performances in floor events saw Smith slide down the rankings. Smith reached the second round in the 2006 PDC World Darts Championship. It would begin a complete loss of form for Smith where poor performances including a second round exit from the 2006 UK Open forced him to qualify for major tournaments. He qualified for the 2006 Las Vegas Desert Classic, losing in the first round to Dennis Priestley. He then suffered a first round defeat in the World Matchplay and failed to qualify for the World Grand Prix and then failed to qualify for the World Championship for the first time.

Smith qualified once again for the Desert Classic. He was knocked out in the Quarter-Final by Part after beating Priestley and Darin Young. He then qualified again for the Desert Classic in 2008, but lost in the first round to James Wade.

He qualified for the 2009 PDC World Darts Championship, winning four matches at the qualifiers in Telford to take one of the last eight places at the Alexandra Palace. He caused a major surprise by beating number five seed Terry Jenkins in the first round. He then defeated Kevin McDine in the second round, coming from three sets to nil down to level the match at three sets all and eventually won the match 4–3. He would go out in round three, losing 4–1 to Mervyn King.

As of 2017, Smith continues to compete on the PDC Pro Tour.

World Championship performances

PDC

 1995: Quarter-finals (lost to John Lowe 0–4)
 1996: Last 24 group (lost to John Lowe 0–3) & (lost to Tom Kirby 1–3)
 1997: Last 24 group (lost to Keith Deller 2–3) & (beat Kevin Spiolek 3–0)
 1998: Last 24 group (lost to Phil Taylor 3–0) & (beat Kevin Spiolek 3–1)
 1999: Quarter-finals (lost to Peter Manley 0–4)
 2000: Semi-finals (lost to Phil Taylor 0–5)
 2001: 2nd round (lost to John Part 2–3)
 2002: 2nd round (lost to Ronnie Baxter 1–6)
 2003: Quarter-finals (lost to Phil Taylor 3–5)
 2004: 4th round (lost to Bob Anderson 3–4)
 2005: 3rd round (lost to Bob Anderson 2–4)
 2006: 3rd round (lost to Peter Manley 3–4)
 2009: 3rd round (lost to Mervyn King 1–4)
 2011: 1st round (lost to Andy Hamilton 0–3)
 2012: 1st round (lost to Simon Whitlock 0–3)
 2014: 1st round (lost to Adrian Lewis 0–3)

Performance timeline

References

External links
Profile and stats on Darts Database

1969 births
English darts players
Living people
Professional Darts Corporation former tour card holders